Rickardsville is a city in Dubuque County, Iowa, United States. The population was 202 at the time of the 2020 census, up from 191 in 2000.

Geography
Rickardsville is located at  (42.582756, -90.880499).

Demographics

2010 census
As of the census of 2010, there were 182 people, 72 households, and 59 families living in the city. The racial makeup of the city was 98.4% White, 1.1% African American, and 0.5% from two or more races.

There were 72 households, of which 31.9% had children under the age of 18 living with them, 76.4% were married couples living together, 4.2% had a female householder with no husband present, 1.4% had a male householder with no wife present, and 18.1% were non-families. 15.3% of all households were made up of individuals, and 1.4% had someone living alone who was 65 years of age or older. The average household size was 2.53 and the average family size was 2.80.

The median age in the city was 39 years. 24.7% of residents were under the age of 18; 5.4% were between the ages of 18 and 24; 23.5% were from 25 to 44; 30.1% were from 45 to 64; and 15.9% were 65 years of age or older. The gender makeup of the city was 53.8% male and 46.2% female.

2000 census
As of the census of 2000, there were 191 people, 71 households, and 58 families living in the city. The racial makeup of the city was 97.38% White, and 2.62% from two or more races. Hispanic or Latino of any race were 3.14% of the population.

There were 71 households, out of which 32.4% had children under the age of 18 living with them, 74.6% were married couples living together, 2.8% had a female householder with no husband present, and 18.3% were non-families. 16.9% of all households were made up of individuals, and 5.6% had someone living alone who was 65 years of age or older. The average household size was 2.69 and the average family size was 3.03.

In the city, the population was spread out, with 26.2% under the age of 18, 7.3% from 18 to 24, 22.0% from 25 to 44, 33.0% from 45 to 64, and 11.5% who were 65 years of age or older. The median age was 40 years. For every 100 females, there were 122.1 males. For every 100 females age 18 and over, there were 107.4 males.

The median income for a household in the city was $43,750, and the median income for a family was $49,750. Males had a median income of $40,000 versus $20,000 for females. The per capita income for the city was $22,768. About 3.2% of families and 3.2% of the population were below the poverty line, including none of those under the age of eighteen or sixty five or over.

Education
Most residents are within the Western Dubuque Community School District. Zoned schools include Epworth Elementary School in Epworth, Drexler Middle School in Farley, and Western Dubuque High School in Epworth.

References

Cities in Dubuque County, Iowa
Cities in Iowa